= SB39 =

SB39 may refer to:

- Saab JAS 39 Gripen, Swedish fighter jet (ICAO aircraft type designator SB39)
- SB39, the name of many bills in United States state legislatures
